Della Penna Motorsports was an auto racing team that competed in the Toyota Atlantic, IndyCar, and CART series from 1990–2000. The team was founded by Argentinian businessman and engineer John Della Penna, who himself raced in Formula Atlantic during the 1980s. Della Penna got its start in Toyota Atlantic with support from driver Jimmy Vasser in 1990, and by the following season was consistently scoring wins. After Vasser left to drive in CART, Della Penna took a two-year sabbatical from the series, with the hopes of returning with young, untested talent.

In 1994 Della Penna signed Richie Hearn to drive in Toyota Atlantic with the hopes of moving up to CART by 1997. Hearn finished second in points that season and won the championship the following season. Della Penna joined the upstart Indy Racing League in 1996 with the goal of transitioning into CART the following year. In five races between 1996 and 1997, Hearn placed 3rd at the Indianapolis 500, scored a pole position at New Hampshire, and won at Las Vegas. That same year Della Penna ran three races during the 1996 CART season using the same equipment as during the 1996 IRL season.

Della Penna went full-time beginning in 1997, but found itself struggling for points and would never finish higher than 5th, despite major sponsorship deals with Budweiser and Fujifilm. The team formed a close relationship with Toyota in 1999 to test its new racing engine program, but still the team's fortunes did not improve. Finally, in 2000, Hearn left CART to  pursue a drive in the IRL and was replaced by ex-Formula One driver Norberto Fontana. Fontana failed to impress early on and was replaced mid-season by Memo Gidley for the rest of the season.

After the 2000 season it was announced that Toyota had ended its partnership with Della Penna, leaving the team without an engine for the 2001 season. Rather than sign with another manufacturer, the team officially folded before the beginning of the season. The team and its assets were sold to Blair Racing while John Della Penna went on to mentor Argentinian driver Pablo Pérez Companc through an open-wheel and sports car career.

Racing Results

Complete SCCA Toyota Atlantic Championship results
(key)

 Non-championship event.

Complete Indy Racing League results
(key)

Complete PPG CART Indycar World Series/CART FedEx Championship Series results
(key)

References

1990 establishments in the United States
American auto racing teams
Champ Car teams
IndyCar Series teams
2000 disestablishments in the United States
Atlantic Championship teams